"Piga och dräng" is a Swedish language music single by Drängarna. The song competed in Melodifestivalen 2020 where it made it to the Second chance round.

Charts

References

2020 singles
Swedish songs
Melodifestivalen songs of 2020
2020 songs